Jarrett M. Durham (born August 22, 1949) is an American former professional basketball player who spent one season in the American Basketball Association (ABA) with the New York Nets during the 1971–72 season. He was drafted in the fourth round (62nd) overall) from Duquesne University by the Detroit Pistons, whom he never played for. He played one game for the Nets. Durham is currently the color analyst for the Duquesne Dukes Basketball Team.

Durham played college basketball for Duquesne. He was later the head coach of  Robert Morris University men's basketball team.

References

External links

1949 births
Living people
American men's basketball coaches
American men's basketball players
Basketball coaches from Pennsylvania
Basketball players from Pennsylvania
College men's basketball head coaches in the United States
Detroit Pistons draft picks
Duquesne Dukes men's basketball coaches
Duquesne Dukes men's basketball players
Forwards (basketball)
Junior college men's basketball coaches in the United States
New York Nets players
Robert Morris Colonials men's basketball coaches